Heliura nivaca is a moth of the subfamily Arctiinae. It was described by E. Dukinfield Jones in 1915. It is found in Brazil.

References

 

Arctiinae
Moths described in 1915